The I See You Tour was the third concert tour by English indie band The xx, in support of their third studio album I See You (2017). The European leg of the tour began in Sweden on 8 February 2017 and concluded on 17 March 2017. The North American leg began on 14 April 2017, as part of Coachella in Indio, California, and continued until 27 May 2017.

Set list 
This set list is representative of the performance on 8 March 2017 at the O2 Academy Brixton in London, England. It does not represent the set list at all concerts for the duration of the tour.

"Say Something Loving"
"Crystalised"
"Islands"
"Lips"
"Sunset"
"Basic Space"
"Performance"
"Brave for You"
"Infinity"
"VCR"
"I Dare You"
"Dangerous"
"Chained"
"A Violent Noise"
"Fiction"
"Shelter"
"Loud Places" (Jamie xx cover)
"On Hold" 
"Intro"  
"Angels"

Tour dates

Box office score data

Notes

References

2017 concert tours
2018 concert tours